The Monument is a 2015 sculpture by Atelier Van Lieshout. It is part of the collection of Alte Nationalgalerie in Berlin, Germany.

References

External links
 

2015 establishments in Germany
2015 sculptures
Equestrian statues in Germany
Outdoor sculptures in Germany
Works by Dutch people